Pisarei e faśö (pronounced:  or ), also called pisarei cui faśö, are a typical pasta dish of the Italian province of Piacenza, among the best known of Piacenza cuisine. These are small gnocchi made of flour and breadcrumbs served with a sauce made of beans, lard, onion and tomato. An ancient peasant recipe, poor but complete, still today it is very popular among the people and in the restaurants of Piacenza.

The dish has been enhanced and regulated with the De.Co. mark by the municipal administration of Piacenza.

History 
A reliable tradition tells that the recipe at the base of pisarei e faśö was developed in the Middle Ages inside the monasteries of Piacenza thanks to the monks, who served recipes of poor but nutritious ingredients to feed pilgrims going to Rome, in transit on the Via Francigena. At one time, dolichos beans were used instead of borlotti beans and the recipe did not include tomato puree, as borlotti beans and tomatoes were introduced in Europe only after the discovery of the Americas.

Etymology 
It is presumable that to give the name to the gnocchetto is its vague resemblance to a small penis, which in Piacenza's dialect is called pisarell. The term comes from the onomatopoeic verb pisä, meaning to urinate.

Preparation 
Pisarei are obtained from a mixture of flour, breadcrumbs and water, which is rolled up to form long cylinders, which in turn are cut into pieces the size of a bean. The pieces, in turn, are crushed and rolled slightly on themselves, so that they take the characteristic shape.

Acknowledgements 
On the proposal of the Emilia-Romagna Region, pisarei and faśö have been included by the Ministry of Agriculture, as one of the traditional Italian food products typical of the province of Piacenza.

References

Bibliography

External links 

 
 Pisarei e faśö la ricetta principe della cucina piacentina, poderecasale.com
Tomato dishes
Pasta dishes
Italian cuisine